The Edmonton Drillers were a Canadian Major Indoor Soccer League team.

History
On January 24, 2007, the formation of the Canadian Major Indoor Soccer League was announced along with that a series of exhibition games would take place in various markets to gauge interest.  Edmonton being one of these markets, the Edmonton Drillers name has been acquired with the expectation of several of the players from the NPSL edition of the club would be reunited for these exhibition matches.

The Showcase Series games were held at Rexall Place. However, the Drillers have moved to the Servus Credit Union Place in St. Albert for the 2008 season. The 2008 CMISL season will see the Drillers kick off January 19 and 20 with games against Saskatoon, Winnipeg and Calgary, all played in Calgary. Prior to that they will play two exhibition games in Prince George, BC,  December 1 and 2, as well as a four pre-season games against Saskatoon in December and early January.  CMISL is teaming up the PASL for the 2008/09 season.  All 4 teams from the CMISL will be a part of the PASL 2008/09 season.

Notable coaches
 2007-2009: Martin Dugas
 2009: Todd Rattee

Staff
Management
Dr. Brent Saik - President/General Manager
Brenda Martin - Business/Ticket Manager
Vikki Saik - Account Executive
Jim Martin - Spokesman
Hamish Black - Manager of Soccer Operations

Sports
Kevin Poissant - Head Coach
Jeff Paulus - Assistant Coach
Sean Sneddon - Equipment Manager

Notable players

 Brett Chartrand
 Martin Dugas
 Sean Fraser
 Kevin Glass
 Dominic Oppong
 Eric Pinnell
 Todd Rattee

 Eric Munoz

 Amuri Kapongo

 Phil Pavičić

 Freddy Malek

 Joseph Costouros

 Tristian Ilko

 Oliver Brkin

 Harman Braich

 Angelo Sestito

 Paul Roncov

 Nikola Vignjević

 Jarin Myskiw
 Sean Myskiw

Year-by-year

External links
Drillers Fans - Fansite complete with extensive information and coverage of the team

Canadian Major Indoor Soccer League teams